Fan Bingbing (born 16 September 1981) is a Chinese actress. From 2013 to 2017, she was included as the highest-paid celebrity in the Forbes China Celebrity 100 list after ranking in the top 10 every year since 2006. She appeared on Time magazine's list of the 100 most influential people in 2017.

Fan's early work was in East Asian cinema and television, notably appearing in drama series My Fair Princess (1998–1999). Her breakthrough came with the film Cell Phone (2003) which was China's highest-grossing film of the year. She went on to star in several Chinese films, which include Lost in Beijing (2007), Buddha Mountain (2011) and Double Xposure (2012). For headlining the film I Am Not Madame Bovary (2016), Fan won awards from the Golden Horse Film Festival, the Tokyo International Film Festival, the San Sebastián International Film Festival and the Golden Rooster Awards. Her foreign film roles include the French film Stretch (2011), the Korean film My Way (2011), the American superhero film X-Men: Days of Future Past (2014) and the Hong Kong-Chinese-American film Skiptrace (2015).

In 2018, Fan disappeared for three months, reportedly during an investigation into her tax affairs by the Chinese authorities. She was reportedly fined a sum greater than her net worth.

Early life
Fan was born in Laixi, Yantai (now Qingdao) and raised in Yantai. She graduated from Shanghai Xie Jin Film and Television Art College and Shanghai Theatre Academy.

Career

1996–2006: Early roles and Cell Phone
Fan debuted in the television series Powerful Woman and played minor roles for two years, before gaining attention in 1999 for her supporting role as Jin Suo in the first two seasons of the Chinese television series My Fair Princess, adapted from Taiwanese writer Chiung Yao's story. She was recommended by Hong Kong actress Leanne Liu to join the cast. The comedic period drama enjoyed widespread success in Asia, making Fan a household name in the region. She rose to fame in East Asia in 1998–1999 with the TV costume drama series My Fair Princess.

In 2003, she starred in Cell Phone, which became China's highest-grossing film of the year and received critical acclaim at the Hundred Flowers Awards. Fan signed an eight-year contract with Chiung Yao's company, which produced My Fair Princess. However, as the company had yet to establish any branches in mainland China, many mainland Chinese television advertising firms had to make calls to Taiwan for negotiations, resulting in a waste of time and effort. Fan won a Best Actress Award at the 27th Hundred Flowers Awards, and an Outstanding New Actress nomination at the 10th Huabiao Awards.

Fan appeared in The Lion Roars (2002), The Twins Effect II (2004), A Chinese Tall Story (2005), and A Battle of Wits (2006). She received a Golden Bauhinia Awards nomination for her role in the Chinese-South-Korean-Japanese epic film A Battle of Wits. In 2006, Forbes China gave her its most prized award, the Star of the Year, for her popularity, high press coverage, and website throughout that year.

2007–2012: Rise to prominence

She has starred in many Chinese films, most notably Lost in Beijing (2007), Buddha Mountain (2011), Double Xposure (2012) and I Am Not Madame Bovary (2016), where she received awards from the Golden Horse Film Festival and Awards, the Tokyo International Film Festival, the San Sebastián International Film Festival and Golden Rooster Awards. She has participated in many foreign-language films, such as the French film Stretch (2011), the Korean film My Way (2011), X-Men: Days of Future Past (2014), in which she portrayed Blink, and the Hong Kong-Chinese-American film Skiptrace (2015), for which she won the Golden Screen Award for Best Actress.Fan left Huayi Brothers in February 2007 and started her own studio, Fan Bingbing Studio. She starred in eight films in 2007, winning the Best Supporting Actress Award at the 44th Golden Horse Film Awards for her role in The Matrimony. That year, her studio made its first television production, Rouge Snow (2008), adapted from the novel of the same name. Fan played the starring role in the production, portraying a poor girl who fights for freedom against fate after being sold to a wealthy and influential clan. In the same year, Fan starred in crime drama film Shinjuku Incident and was praised by critics for her performance. Fan featured in historical action film Bodyguards and Assassins, which earned her a Best Supporting Actress nomination at the Hong Kong Film Awards.

In 2010, Fan starred in Chen Kaige's historical epic, Sacrifice. Fan said that she chose the role as she was moved by Princess Zhuang Ji's great courage and a very fierce maternal love. On 24 October, Buddha Mountain starring Fan premiered at the 23rd Tokyo International Film Festival, and earned her the Best Actress Award. In April 2010, Fan was ranked first on the "50 Most Beautiful People in China" list by the newspaper Beijing News. In 2011, Fan starred in the martial arts film Shaolin alongside Andy Lau and Jackie Chan and The Founding of a Party, which was released to mark the 90th anniversary of the Communist Party of China. In May, she appeared at the 64th Cannes Film Festival to promote My Way together with director Kang Je-gyu and actors Jang Dong-gun and Joe Odagiri. In October, she became a member of the International Competition Jury of 24th Tokyo International Film Festival.

For the first half of 2012, Fan attended many fashion shows in Paris. On 16 May, she attended the opening ceremony of the 65th Cannes Film Festival as the only East Asian global spokesperson on behalf of L'Oréal Paris. Forbes ranked Fan third on the 2012 Forbes China Celebrity 100 List based on her success in that year. In the film Double Xposure, which was released in China on 29 September, she portrays a girl who, after suffering trauma during childhood, experiences visual hallucinations after witnessing her father kill her mother. Most film critics praised to Fan's performance, and she won the Huading Awards for Best Actress. On 12 December, Fan appeared in Lost in Thailand, in which she did an unpaid cameo so as to "help" her first-time filmmaker friend, Xu Zheng. The film broke the box office record for Chinese films in China to become one of the highest-grossing Chinese films of all time.

2013–present: International ventures and established actress 
In 2013, Fan appeared as Dr. Wu's assistant, Wu Jiaqi, in the mainland Chinese version of Iron Man 3, which was released on 1 May. The same year, she starred alongside Aarif Rahman in the romantic comedy One Night Surprise, which aired on Chinese Valentine's Day. The low-budget film became a commercial success and received positive reviews. On 22 December, Fan received the Best Actress Award and the Hottest Figure Award at the Baidu Hot Ceremony. In 2014, Fan portrayed the mutant Blink (Clarice Ferguson) in the American superhero film X-Men: Days of Future Past. She also announced that she has a four-film contract with 20th Century Fox, yet she has not appeared in another X-Men film since. The film was released globally and resulted in increased international fame and recognition for Fan. On 31 May, Barbie announced the launch of the Fan Bingbing Celebrity Specialty doll in Shanghai. Louis Vuitton also chose Fan as the first Asian actress to be provided with a specially tailored dress for their red carpet.

In the series The Empress of China, Fan portrays the titular character Wu Zetian, the only female emperor in Chinese history. The 82-episode TV series was broadcast on Hunan Television from 21 December 2014 to 5 February 2015, and recorded the highest ratings for the year. The same year, she starred in wuxia fantasy film The White Haired Witch of Lunar Kingdom. In 2015, Fan joined the CCTV variety show as a judge in Amazing Chinese and as a contestant in the reality television show Challenger's Alliance. Fan won the Best Actress award at the 1st Berlin Chinese Film Festival for her role in the film. She was ranked fourth on Forbes World's Highest-Paid Actresses list for 2015.

In 2016, Fan featured in the action comedy Skiptrace alongside Jackie Chan and American actor Johnny Knoxville, which won her the Best Supporting Actress award at the 1st Golden Screen Awards. Fan then starred in Guo Jingming's L.O.R.D: Legend of Ravaging Dynasties. The film, which was released on 30 September, is China's first computer-animated motion film. Fan won the Silver Shell for Best Actress at the 64th San Sebastián International Film Festival and Golden Rooster Award for Best Actress for her performance in I Am Not Madame Bovary directed by Feng Xiaogang.

Fan was honored at the 2017 Time 100 Gala in Manhattan, recognized on Time magazine's list of the one-hundred most influential people of 2017. In April 2017, Fan was announced to serve in the 70th Cannes Film Festival jury. The same year, she starred in Sky Hunter, China's first aerial warfare film. Fan was named global ambassador of several brands such as ReFa Beauty Care Tools, De Beers, King Power and Montblanc. In 2018, Fan was cast in Cao Baoping's crime drama film The Perfect Blue. In the same year, she was cast in the spy-thriller film 355, alongside Jessica Chastain, Penélope Cruz, Lupita Nyong'o, Diane Kruger, Sebastian Stan and Édgar Ramírez; it was released in January 2022. Fan attended the IQIYI Ninth Anniversary Gala in Beijing on 22 April 2019.

Just 4 days later, she released her own brand Fan Beauty Secret first moisturizing mask. Fan was in attendance at the Shanghai Beauty Summit on 12 July and the 12th China Cosmetic Summit on 22 July.

The tax incident had some impact on Fan, her business endorsement is still there, but her film and television works could not be released on the mainland China, the role Fan played in L.O.R.D 2 were modified by CG, and The Legend of Ba Qing that had been completed were not set for release.

In the following years, Fan focused mainly on the management of her own brand Fan Beauty Secret and appeared in many fashion occasions. In 2019, Fan covered Grazia (Korean edition), L'Officiel (Russian edition) and Marie Claire (Malaysian edition). In 2020, Fan covered many Chinese magazines, such as Chic, Cosmobride, Bella (Chinese edition), No. 9 modern, Wonderland (Chinese edition), etc. The covers of foreign magazines include T (Singapore edition), Flaunt (US edition), Wonderland (UK edition), 美 ST (Japanese edition), and Schon (UK edition), etc. Her personal cosmetics brand, Fan Beauty Secret, had a turnover of more than 100 million CNY during the Double Eleven Shopping Festival. In 2021, Fan covered the L'Officiel (Singapore edition), The Laterals, Munero (Netherlands edition), and Grazia (international edition and Middle East edition). Fan also starred in 15 minutes short film. Fan was invited to watch many fashion shows in China. Due to the flood in Henan Province, she donated 1 million yuan to help people in the disaster-stricken areas and donated books worth 2 million yuan to 14 schools in Xinjiang. In 2022, she starred in two films that were released in North America, The 355 and The King's Daughter. She also participated in the Korean TV series Insider. In 2023, Green Night, which she starred in, premiered at the Panorama section of the Berlinale.

Personal life 
On 29 May 2015, it was announced on Li Chen's social media that he and Fan Bingbing were dating. On 16 September 2017, the couple got engaged after he proposed to Fan at her birthday party. The couple announced their separation on 27 June 2019.

Fan has a younger brother named Fan Chengcheng who is one of the members of the boy group Nine Percent and NEXT.  She is a member of the Communist Party of China. Fan has been active in helping children with congenital heart disease receive screening. Since August 2010, Fan has helped more than 340 children with congenital heart disease receive medical treatment in Beijing and Shanghai.

Tax evasion incident 
On 28 May 2018, TV anchor Cui Yongyuan used social media to leak a redacted contract disclosing Fan being paid  for her four days of work on the upcoming Feng Xiaogang film Cell Phone 2. This disclosure prompted Jiangsu Provincial and Wuxi City tax authorities to investigate a suspected case of tax evasion. Fan's studio issued a statement denying that she had ever signed separate contracts for a single job, and stated that they would cooperate fully with authorities in the investigation and would address public concerns.

Questions, concerns, and rumors about Fan's whereabouts grew when she was not seen after a last public appearance on 1 July 2018 and a lack of activity on social media after 23 July. As Fan was presumed missing, rumours suggested that Fan had been arrested but were not confirmed. In August, Fan's manager Jersey Chong stated via social media that Fan was never arrested.

Filmography

Discography

Studio albums

Singles

Awards and nominations

Notes

References

External links

 
 
 
 
 
 Bingbing Fan on Photostags

1981 births
20th-century Chinese actresses
21st-century Chinese actresses
Living people
Actresses from Qingdao
Shanghai Theatre Academy alumni
Singers from Shandong
Chinese television producers
Musicians from Qingdao
Chinese film actresses
Chinese television actresses
21st-century Chinese women singers
Women television producers
Best Actress Asian Film Award winners
The Amazing Race contestants
Enforced disappearances in China
Chinese people convicted of tax crimes